At Yankee Stadium is the sixth studio album from NRBQ (New Rhythm and Blues Quartet), released in 1978 on Mercury Records. In keeping with the band's sense of humor, the album's title is a joke; the album credits read "Recorded at Bearsville Studios, November 1977 (not at Yankee Stadium)". The packaging includes photographs of the band members in an otherwise empty Yankee Stadium; these were taken as a birthday treat for bass player and founding band member Joey Spampinato, when his bandmates arranged a private visit to the ballpark. Spampinato, a Bronx native, is a lifelong Yankees fan.

The album was released in two versions. Early copies included the song "Ridin' In My Car", which had been previously released on All Hopped Up, an album N.R.B.Q. released on their own record label (Red Rooster Records) the previous year.  "Ridin' in My Car" was subsequently omitted from later versions of At Yankee Stadium.

Track listing
 "Green Lights" (Terry Adams, Joseph Spampinato) – 	2:54
 "Just Ain't Fair" (Spampinato) – 	3:01
 "I Love Her, She Loves Me" (Spampinato) – 	2:28
 "Get Rhythm" (Johnny Cash) – 	2:58
 "That's Neat, That's Nice" (Adams) – 	3:09
 "Ain't No Free" (Adams) – 	3:24
 "I Want You Bad" (Adams, Phil Crandon) – 	2:32
 "The Same Old Thing" (Sherlie Matthews) – 	2:21
 "Yes, Yes, Yes" (Adams) – 	2:53
 "It Comes to Me Naturally" (Al Anderson) – 	3:00
 "Talk to Me" (Adams) – 	2:41
 "Shake, Rattle and Roll" (Charles E. Calhoun) – 	3:10
 "Ridin' in My Car" (Al Anderson) - 	2:52

Personnel
NRBQ
Terry Adams - vocals, piano, organ, Hohner Clavinet
Al Anderson - guitar, vocals
Joey Spampinato - bass, acoustic guitar, vocals
Tom Ardolino - drums
The Whole Wheat Horns - horns
Keith Spring - saxophone
Donn Adams - trombone

Notes 

1978 albums
NRBQ albums
Mercury Records albums